Progress M-16 was a Russian uncrewed cargo spacecraft which was launched in 1993 to resupply the Mir space station. The thirty-fourth of sixty-four Progress spacecraft to visit Mir, it used the Progress-M 11F615A55 configuration, and had the serial number 216. It carried supplies including food, water and oxygen for the EO-13 crew aboard Mir, as well as equipment for conducting scientific research, and fuel for adjusting the station's orbit and performing manoeuvres.

Progress M-16 was launched at 18:32:32 GMT on 21 February 1993, atop a Soyuz-U2 carrier rocket flying from Site 1/5 at the Baikonur Cosmodrome. Following two days of free flight, it docked with the aft port of the Kvant-1 module at 20:17:57 GMT on 23 February.

It undocked from Mir at 06:50:00 GMT on 26 March, before redocking with the same port at 07:06:03 to test its docking systems. It undocked for the final time at 04:21:00 GMT on 27 March, and was deorbited few hours later at 10:25:00, to a destructive reentry over the Pacific Ocean.

See also

1993 in spaceflight
List of Progress flights
List of uncrewed spaceflights to Mir

References

Spacecraft launched in 1993
Progress (spacecraft) missions